The external intercostal muscles,  or external intercostals (Intercostales externi) are eleven in number on both sides.

Structure 

The muscles extend from the tubercles of the ribs behind, to the cartilages of the ribs in front, where they end in thin membranes, the external intercostal membranes, which are continued forward to the sternum.
These muscles work in unison when inhalation occurs. The internal intercostal muscles relax while the external muscles contract causing the expansion of the chest cavity and an influx of air into the lungs.

Each arises from the lower border of a rib, and is inserted into the upper border of the rib below. In the two lower spaces they extend to the ends of the cartilages, and in the upper two or three spaces they do not quite reach the ends of the ribs.

They are thicker than the internal intercostals, and their fibers are directed obliquely downward and laterally on the back of the thorax, and downward, forward, and medially on the front.

Variations
Continuation with the external oblique or serratus anterior: A supracostalis muscle, from the anterior end of the first rib down to the second, third or fourth ribs occasionally occurs.

Additional images

See also
Inhalation

References

Muscles of the torso